(bapt. 23 September 1828 – 10 May 1899) was a British children's writer and illustrator, perhaps best known for her adventure novel Left to Themselves: A Boy's Adventure in Australia (1878) – later published as The Young Lamberts. The novel is set in Australia, but she is not known to have ever visited the continent.

Life 
Marryat was born in Fulham, Surrey, England, the daughter of Frederick Marryat and his wife Catherine (née Shairp). Captain Marryat was a successful popular novelist and two of Augusta's sisters, Florence and Emilia, also became writers. Augusta wrote adventure fiction heavily infused with morality in her father's vein, and Florence was a prolific author of sensationalist novels who also acquired a reputation for hanging out with spiritual mediums.

She died in Surrey in 1899.

Selected works 

 Lost in the Jungle: A Story of the Indian Mutiny (London: Griffith and Farran, 1877).
 Left to Themselves: A Boy's Adventures in Australia (London: Frederick Warne, 1878).
 The Reverse of the Shield: or, The Adventures of Grenville Le Marchant during the Franco-Prussian War (London: Frederick Warne, 1879)

A full bibliography is available in The Cambridge Bibliography of English Literature: 1800-1900, Vol. 4.

References

External links 

  (no catalogue records December 2018)

19th-century English novelists
Victorian novelists
Victorian women writers
English women novelists
1828 births
1899 deaths
19th-century English women writers
19th-century British writers